Metoeca is a genus of moths of the family Crambidae. It contains only one species Metoeca foedalis, which has a wide distribution, including the Democratic Republic of Congo, Equatorial Guinea, South Africa, China, Japan, Taiwan, Thailand and Australia (Queensland).

The wingspan is about 15 mm. Adult are white with dark brown dots and lines and pale brown blobs.

References

Spilomelinae
Monotypic moth genera
Moths of Africa
Moths of Japan
Crambidae genera
Taxa named by William Warren (entomologist)